Rideau Lakes is a township located within Leeds and Grenville United Counties in Eastern Ontario, Canada. The township was incorporated on 1 January 1998 by amalgamating the former townships of North Crosby, South Crosby, Bastard, South Burgess and South Elmsley with the village of Newboro.

Rideau Lakes lies in the northwest corner of Leeds and Grenville, and is geographically the largest municipality in the county.

Farming, tourism, and service industries form the backbone of the local economy. The many tourist attractions in Rideau Lakes, including historic trails, the stone arch dam at Jones Falls, and the Rideau Canal, are also an important part of the township's economy.

Rideau Lakes has  of shoreline, excluding the Rideau Waterway. The waterway itself traverses the township, from the towering granite cliffs near Chaffeys Lock to the more gentle and pastoral areas of the Lower Rideau Lake.

Communities
Rideau Lakes contains many villages and hamlets, including Chaffeys Lock, Chantry, Crosby, Daytown, Delta, Elgin, Forfar, Freeland, Harlem, Jones Falls, Lombardy, Morton, Newboro, Newboyne, Philipsville, Plum Hollow, Portland, Rideau Ferry, and Scotch Point.  The township administrative offices are located in the hamlet of Chantry.

The independent village of Westport is entirely surrounded by Rideau Lakes, but is not part of the township.

The town of Smiths Falls is mostly located in Lanark County, while parts of the southern areas of the town is in the township of Rideau Lakes in the United Counties of Leeds and Grenville.

Newboro
A plaque was erected by the Ontario Heritage Foundation commemorating the founding of Newboro with the building of the Rideau Canal in 1826–32. Benjamin Tett settled here in 1833. He opened a store and later a post office. The community served as a major construction camp during the building of the Rideau Canal. Newboro was a trade centre for the region's lumbering industry and agriculture. The economic development of the community was enabled by the shipment of iron ore from local mines via the Rideau canal to smelters in Pittsburgh and Cleveland during the latter part of the 19th century.
The Village of Newboro was incorporated in 1876.

Chaffey's Lock
A plaque was erected by the Ontario Heritage Foundation commemorating the founding of Chaffey's Lock by Benjamin and Samuel Chaffey, who established mills here in 1820. Samuel Chaffey settling here shortly thereafter. The site included a distillery and saw, grist, carding, and fulling mills by 1827. The mills were flooded by the building of the Rideau Canal. A plaque was erected by the Chaffey's Lock and Area Heritage Society commemorating the founders, early builders, and all who have been part of the Chaffey's Lock community. Plaques have been erected by individuals and families on the Memory Wall, at Chaffey's Lock Cemetery.

The Queen's University Biological Station is located just southwest of Chaffey's Lock.

Trout island is a double island on the Rideau lakes; it became famous for its great trout fishing. There are three cottages on the island.

Tourism and attractions
The Rideau Trail, a 300-km footpath from Kingston to Ottawa, passes through the township.  The highest point on the trail is located in the Foley Mountain Conservation Area, which is located within the township.  The Cataraqui Trail, a rail trail on a former Canadian National right-of-way, goes through the township, passing near Portland, Elgin, and Chaffey's Lock.  The Old Stone Mill National Historic Site is located within the village of Delta.

Demographics 

Population trend:
 Population in 2011: 10,207
 Population in 2006: 10,350
 Population in 2001: 9,687
 Population in 1996:
 Bastard and South Burgess Township: 2692
 Newboro Village: 291
 North Crosby Township: 1097
 South Crosby Township: 1910
 South Elmsley Township: 3574
 Population in 1991: 
 Bastard and South Burgess Township: 2610
 Newboro Village: 282
 North Crosby Township: 968
 South Crosby Township: 1677
 South Elmsley Township: 3065

Mother tongue:
 English as first language: 94.2%
 French as first language: 2.1%
 English and French as first language: 0.3%
 Other as first language: 3.4%

See also
Hotel Kenney
 List of municipalities in Ontario
List of townships in Ontario

References

External links

Township municipalities in Ontario
Lower-tier municipalities in Ontario
Municipalities in Leeds and Grenville United Counties
Populated places established in 1998
1998 establishments in Ontario